Ian Salmon (born 4 November 1952) is  a former Australian rules footballer who played with Footscray in the Victorian Football League (VFL).

Notes

External links 

1952 births
Living people
Australian rules footballers from Victoria (Australia)
Western Bulldogs players
Leongatha Football Club players